Valerie Lynn Baker Fairbank (born June 25, 1949) is a senior United States district judge of the United States District Court for the Central District of California.

Early life and education
Born in Minneapolis, Minnesota, Fairbank received a Bachelor of Arts degree from the University of California, Santa Barbara in 1971, a Master of Arts from that institution in 1972, and a Juris Doctor from the University of California, Los Angeles School of Law, in 1975.

Career
After being admitted to the State Bar of California in 1975, Fairbank entered private practice as an associate at the firm Overton, Lyman & Prince until 1977. From 1977 to 1980, she was an Assistant United States Attorney in the Criminal Division of the United States Attorney's Office for the Central District of California. She re-entered private practice as an associate for two years and a partner for four years at the firm Lillick, McHose & Charles from 1980 to 1986.

Judicial service
From 1986 to 1987, Fairbank served as a judge for the Los Angeles Municipal Court, and from 1987 until her appointment to the federal bench in 2007, she served as a judge for the Superior Court of California, County of Los Angeles.

On January 9, 2007, Fairbank was nominated by President George W. Bush to a seat on the United States District Court for the Central District of California vacated by Consuelo Bland Marshall. Fairbank was confirmed by the United States Senate on February 1, 2007, and received her commission on February 16, 2007. She took senior status on March 1, 2012, due to a certified disability.

References

External links 

U.S. Dept. of Justice profile

Living people
1949 births
Assistant United States Attorneys
California state court judges
Judges of the United States District Court for the Central District of California
Lawyers from Minneapolis
Superior court judges in the United States
United States district court judges appointed by George W. Bush
21st-century American judges
UCLA School of Law alumni
University of California, Santa Barbara alumni
21st-century American women judges